The first series of My Bromance: The Series began on December 11, 2016.

Episodes 
To be updated as more information is revealed

Lists of Thai drama television series episodes